Mammadali Mammad oghlu Abbasov (January 7, 1907 — November 22, 2000) was an Azerbaijani-Soviet statesman, Minister of Construction of the Azerbaijan SSR, Minister of Industrial Construction of the Azerbaijan SSR.

Biography 
Mammadali Abbasov was born on January 7, 1907, in the city of Ordzhonikidze (now Vladikavkaz). He is originally from Nakhchivan. From 1924 to 1929 he studied at the railway construction faculty of the Leningrad Institute of Railway Engineers.

In 1930–1931 he was the chief field engineer of the Azerbaijan Main Water Facilities Construction Department in Baku and Kirovabad. In 1932–1934 he served in the Soviet Army, in 1935–1945 he worked as an engineer in various construction organizations of Baku. He worked here as a road engineer, local road inspector, field chief, and then deputy chief engineer of the Baku Construction Trust.

In 1937, when the construction of Sumgayit TPS, the largest thermal power station in Azerbaijan at that time, began, Mammadali Abbasov was appointed chief engineer of construction. During the Great Patriotic War, he held a number of responsible positions in the system of the Azerneft oil refinery. From 1946 to 1950 he was the head and chief of the Capital Construction Department at the USSR Ministry of Oil Industry. From 1951 he worked as Deputy Chief of the Azerbaijan Marine Oil Union, and from 1957 as Chief of the Capital Construction Department of the National Economic Council of the Azerbaijan SSR. From 1962 he was the Minister of Construction of the Azerbaijan SSR.

Mammadali Abbasov was a candidate member of the Central Committee of the Communist Party of Azerbaijan in 1964–1966, a former member since 1966, and was elected a deputy to the Supreme Soviet of the Azerbaijan SSR (2nd, 5th-7th convocations). He was awarded the "Red Banner of Labor", "Badge of Honor" and medals.

Mammadali Abbasov died on November 22, 2000, in Baku.

References 

1907 births
2000 deaths
Azerbaijan Communist Party (1920) politicians
Recipients of the Order of the Red Banner of Labour
People from Vladikavkaz